Hortus Cantabrigiensis is a catalogue of plants grown in the Walkerian Botanic Garden, a forerunner of the present Botanic Garden of Cambridge University, originally compiled by its first curator James Donn and published in 1796. A further 12 editions were published, the last in 1845, long after Donn's death.

References

Florae (publication)
Book series introduced in 1796
1796 non-fiction books
1845 non-fiction books